is the generic name of the Hunter-gatherer population which lived in the Japanese archipelago during the Jōmon period. The Jōmon people constituted a coherent population but displayed geographically defined regional subgroups.

Multiple studies on the Jōmon population analyzed the genetic contribution to modern Japanese. Jōmon samples, represented by a specimen obtained from the Funadomari archaeological site on Rebun Island and two specimens obtained from Honshu, show that mainstream Japanese people have inherited an average of 10-20% Jōmon ancestry in their genome. The results of a study from 2021 inferred gene flow from the Jōmon population to the modern Japanese across all migration models tested, with genetic contributions ranging from 8.9 to 11.5%. In the same study, the mean Jōmon component of the modern Japanese individual estimated using the admixture analysis was 9.31%.

Population genomic data from various Jōmon period samples show that they diverged from other East Asian people around 30,000 years ago (38-20kya). Following their migration into the Japanese archipelago in 15,000 to 20,000 BCE, they became largely isolated from outside geneflow.  A tie between Jomon and Yana was detected but it was only marginally significant. Further validation studies using better-quality ancient samples would be necessary. Future studies, particularly additional samples of Paleo-Siberians and ancient Central Asians, would help to elucidate the reason for the potential genetic connection between Yana and Jomon people.

Morphological characteristics 

Several studies of numerous Jōmon skeletal remains that were excavated from various locations in the Japanese archipelago allowed researchers to learn more about the Jōmon period population of Japan. The Jōmon people were relatively close to other East Asians, however shared more similarities with Native American samples. Within Japan, regional variance among different Jōmon remains was detected. Historically, the Jōmon people were classified as Mongoloid.

Dental morphology suggests that the Jōmon had Sundadont dental structure which is more common among modern Southeast Asians and Indigenous Taiwanese, and is ancestral to the Sinodont dental structure commonly found among modern Northeast Asians, suggesting that the Jōmon split from the common "Ancestral East Asians" prior to the formation of modern Northeast Asians.

According to the article "Jōmon culture and the peopling of the Japanese archipelago" by Schmidt and Seguchi (2014), the prehistoric Jōmon people descended from various paleolithic populations, which migrated into the Japanese archipelago, using different routes at different times. They concluded:
"In this respect, the biological identity of the Jomon is heterogeneous, and it may be indicative of diverse peoples who possibly belonged to a common culture, known as the Jomon. ... These results suggest a level of inter-regional heterogeneity not expected among Jomon groups. This observation is further substantiated by the studies of Kanzawa-Kiriyama et al. (2013) and Adachi et al. (2013). Kanzawa-Kiriyama et al. (2013) analysed craniometrics and extracted aDNA from museum samples that came from the Sanganji shell mound site in Fukushima Prefecture dated to the Final Jomon Period. They tested for regional differences and found the Tokoku Jomon (northern Honshu) were more similar to Hokkaido Jomon than to geographically adjacent Kanto Jomon (central Honshu). Adachi et al. (2013) described the craniometrics and aDNA sequence from a Jomon individual from Nagano (Yugora cave site) dated to the middle of the initial Jomon Period (7920–7795 cal BP). This individual carried ancestry, which is widely distributed among modern East Asians (Nohira et al. 2010; Umetsu et al. 2005) and resembled modern East Asian comparison samples rather than the geographical close Urawa Jomon sample."

A study published in the scientific journal Nature by Jinam et al. in 2015, using genome-wide SNP data comparison, found that the Hokkaido Jōmon samples, ancestral to the Ainu people, carried two gene alleles associated with facial features that are commonly found among Europeans and Middle-Easterners.

Kondo et al. 2017, analyzed the regional morphological and craniometric characteristics of the Jōmon period population of Japan, and found that they were morphologically heterogeneous and displayed differences along a Northeast to Southwest cline. They concluded that the "Jomon skulls, especially in the neurocranium, exhibit a discernible level of northeast-to-southwest geographical cline across the Japanese archipelago, placing the Hokkaido and Okinawa samples at both extreme ends. The following scenarios can be hypothesized with caution: (a) the formation of Jomon population seemed to proceed in eastern or central Japan, not western Japan (Okinawa or Kyushu regions); (b) the Kyushu Jomon could have a small-sized and isolated population history; and (c) the population history of Hokkaido Jomon could have been deeply rooted and/or affected by long-term extrinsic gene flows."

In 2021, it was confirmed that the ancient population of Hokkaido formed from proper Jōmon people and from "Terminal Upper-Paleolithic people" (TUP people) indigenous to Paleolithic Northern Eurasia. The proper Jōmon groups arrived at about 15,000 BCE from East Asia, and merged with the earlier arrived "Terminal Upper-Paleolithic North Eurasians", to form the local Hokkaido Jōmon. Previously, Gakuhari et al. 2020 similarly noted the possibility of geneflow from Ancient North Eurasians (samplified by the MA-1 sample), or a similar group, into northern Japan, which can be demonstrably linked to the introduction of the microblade culture of Siberia.

Languages 
It is not known what language or languages were spoken in Japan during the Jōmon period. Suggested languages are: the Ainu language, Japonic languages, Austronesian languages, or unknown and today extinct languages. While the most supported view is to equate the Ainu language with the Jōmon language, this view is not uncontroversial or easily acceptable as there were probably multiple distinct language families spoken by the Jōmon period population of the Japanese archipelago.

Alexander Vovin (1993) argues that the Ainu languages originated in Central Honshu, and were later pushed northwards into Hokkaido, where the early Ainu-speakers merged with local groups, forming the historical Ainu ethnicity. Bilingualism between Ainu and Japanese was common in Tohoku until the 10th century. A study by Lee and Hasegawa (2013) of the Waseda University, however, found evidence that the Ainu language originated from the Okhotsk population, which expanded roughly 2,000 years ago from northern Hokkaido southwards into Tohoku.

Vovin (2021) presented arguments for the presence of Austronesian peoples within the Japanese archipelago during the Jōmon period, based on previous linguistic, historical, and cultural evidence, specifically referring to the historical Hayato and Kumaso people. Vovin found specific Austronesian vocabulary loaned into the core vocabulary of (Insular) Japanese. He suggests that Austronesian-speakers arrived in Japan during the Jōmon period and prior to the arrival of Yayoi period migrants, associated with the spread of Japonic languages. These Austronesian-speakers were subsequently assimilated into the Japanese ethnicity. Evidence for non-Ainuic, non-Austronesian, and non-Korean loanwords are found among Insular Japonic languages, and probably derived from unknown and extinct Jōmon languages.

Some linguists suggest that the Japonic languages may have been already present within the Japanese archipelago and coastal Korea, before the Yayoi period, and can be linked to one of the Jōmon populations of southwestern Japan, rather than the later Yayoi or Kofun period rice-agriculturalists. Japonic-speakers than expanded during the Yayoi period, assimilating the newcomers, adopting rice-agriculture, and fusing mainland Asian technologies with local traditions.

Culture
The culture of the Jōmon people was largely based on food collection and hunting, but it is also suggested that the Jōmon people practiced early agriculture. They gathered tree nuts and shellfish, were involved in hunting and fishing, and also practiced some degree of agriculture. The Jōmon people also used stoneware and pottery, and generally lived in pit dwellings.

Some elements of modern Japanese culture may have come from the Jōmon culture. Among these elements are the precursory beliefs to modern Shinto, some marriage customs, some architectural styles, and possibly some technological developments such as lacquerware, laminated , metalworking, and glass making.

Pottery 
The style of pottery created by the Jōmon people is identifiable for its "cord-marked" patterns, hence the name . The pottery styles characteristic of the first phases of Jōmon culture used decoration created by impressing cords into the surface of wet clay, and are generally accepted to be among the oldest forms of pottery in East Asia and the world. Next to clay pots and vessels, the Jōmon also made many highly stylized statues, clay masks, stone batons or rods and swords.

Craftsmanship 

There is evidence that the Jōmon people built ships out of large trees and used them for fishing and traveling; however, there is no agreement as to whether they used sails or paddles. The Jōmon people also used obsidian, jade and different kinds of wood. The Jōmon people created many jewelry and ornamental items; for instance,  were likely invented by one of the Jōmon tribes, and are commonly found throughout Japan and less in Northeast Asia.

Religion 

It is suggested that the religion of the Jōmon people was similar to early Shinto (specifically Ko-Shintō). It was largely based on animism, and possibly shamanism. Other similar religions are the Ryukyuan and Ainu religions.

Origins 

The Jōmon people predominantly descended from an Ancestral East Asian population expanding out of Mainland Southeast Asia or the southeastern Himalayan region. Geneflow from Upper-Paleolithic groups of Northern Eurasia and Siberia was detected in local Jōmon period samples from Hokkaido and Tohoku. Evidence suggests that the ethnic roots of the Jōmon period population was rather heterogeneous and that migration routes can be traced back to ancient Northeast Asia, the Tibetan plateau, ancient Taiwan and paleolithic Siberia. According to a 2009 study, the Jōmon people are an admixture of several distinct ethnic groups.

According to the review article “Jōmon culture and the peopling of the Japanese archipelago” by Schmidt and Seguchi (2014), the prehistoric Jōmon people descended from diverse paleolithic populations with multiple migrations into Jōmon-period Japan. They concluded: "In this respect, the biological identity of the Jomon is heterogeneous, and it may be indicative of diverse peoples who possibly belonged to a common culture, known as the Jomon".

Genetics 

Full genome analyses in 2020 and 2021 revealed further information regarding the origin of the Jōmon peoples. The genetic results suggest early admixture between different groups in Japan already during the Paleolithic, followed by constant geneflow from coastal East Asian groups, resulting in a heterogeneous population which then homogenized until the arrival of the Yayoi people. Geneflow from Northeast Asia during the Jōmon period is associated geneflow from the Tibetan Plateau and Southern China is associated with the D1a2a (previously D1b) and D1a1 (previously D1a) lineages. Geneflow from ancient Siberia was also detected into the northern Jōmon people of Hokkaido, with later geneflow from Hokkaido into parts of northern Honshu (Tohoku). The lineages K and F are suggested to have been presented during the early Jōmon period but got replaced by C and D. The genetic evidence suggests that an East Asian source population, near the Himalayan mountain range, contributed ancestry to the Jōmon period population of Japan, and less to ancient Southeast Asians. The authors concluded that this points to an inland migration through southern or central China towards Japan during the Paleolithic. Another ancestry component seem to have arrived from Siberia into Hokkaido. Archeological and biological evidence link the southern Jōmon culture of Kyushu, Shikoku and parts of Honshu to cultures of southern China and Northeast India. A common culture, known as "Broadleaved Evergreen Forest Culture", ranged from southwestern Japan through southern China towards Northeast India and southern Tibet, and was characterized by the cultivation of Azuki beans.

Another study, published in the Cambridge University Press in 2020, concluded that there was also a migration of ancient Northeast Asians at approximately 6000BC (or already at ~10,000BC), which introduced the Incipient Jōmon culture, typified by early ceramic cultures such as the ones found at Ōdai Yamamoto I Jōmon Site or Aoyagamiji site in the Tottori prefecture. The authors argue that this migration may be the source of the Japonic languages rather than the later Yayoi migration.

A 2021 study concluded that the Jōmon people descended from a common Basal-East Asian source population in Mainland Southeast Asia, which also gave rise to the other East Asian-related populations. The Jōmon people however became isolated from other East Asians on the Japanese archipelago at about 15,000 BCE, which resulted in their relative more Basal position compared to other East Asians.

A review article in 2022 by Professor and historian Melinda A. Yang, concluded that the main Jōmon lineage is closely related to other populations on the "East- and Southeast Asian lineage" (ESEA), which descended from a source population in Mainland Southeast Asia, and gave rise to all modern East and Southeast Asian people, Indigenous peoples of Siberia, and Indigenous peoples of the Americas, as well as the ancient Hoabinhian lineage and the Tianyuan lineage, and which is distinct from the Australasian (AA) or West-Eurasian lineages.

Paternal lineages
It is thought that the haplogroups D-M55 (D1a2a) and C1a1  were frequent in Jōmon period people. O-M119 is also suggested to have been presented in at least some Jōmon period people. One 3,800 year old Jōmon man excavated from Rebun Island was found to belong to Haplogroup D1a2b1(D-CTS 220). Haplogroup D-M55 is found in about 35% and haplogroup C1a1 in about 6% of modern Japanese people.

D-M55 is only found in Japanese (Ainu, Ryukyuans, and Yamato). Haplogroup C1a1 has been found in modern Japanese at a frequency of 6%. Elsewhere it was found at low frequency in Koreans, and northeast Chinese. Recently it was confirmed that the Japanese branch of haplogroup D-M55 is distinct and isolated from other D-branches since more than 53,000 years. The split between D1a2-M55 and D1a-F6251 (the latter of which is common in Tibetans, other Tibeto-Burmese groups, and Altaians, and has a moderate distribution in the rest of East Asia, Southeast Asia, and Central Asia) may have occurred near the Tibetan Plateau.
A DNA study in 2019 suggests that haplogroup D-M55 increased to about 70% during the late Jōmon period, suggesting a population boom and bust shortly before the Yayoi migration. Another study similar concluded that D-M55 became the dominant haplogroup in Japan during the late Jōmon period.

Maternal lineages
MtDNA Haplogroup Jōmon people is characterized by the presence of haplogroups M7a and N9b. Studies published in 2004 and 2007 show the combined frequency of M7a and N9b observed in modern Japanese to be from 12~15% to 17% in mainstream Japanese. N9b is frequently found in the Hokkaido Jomons while M7a is found frequently in the Tohoku Jomons. However N9b is found at very low percent in the Kanto Jomons.

M7a is estimated to share a most recent common ancestor with M7b'c, a clade whose members are found mainly in Japan (including Jōmon people), other parts of East Asia, and Southeast Asia, 33,500 (95% CI 26,300 <-> 42,000) years before present. All extant members of haplogroup M7a are estimated to share a most recent common ancestor 20,500 (95% CI 14,700 <-> 27,800) years before present. Haplogroup M7a now has its highest frequency in Okinawa.

Haplogroup N9b is estimated to share a most recent common ancestor with N9a and Y, two clades that are widespread in eastern Asia, 37,700 (95% CI 29,600 <-> 47,300) years before present. All extant members of haplogroup N9b are estimated to share a most recent common ancestor 21,100 (95% CI 16,700 <-> 26,200) years before present. Haplogroup N9b now has its highest frequency among Tungusic peoples in southeastern Siberia (especially Udeges), but it has been found to be very common in skeletal remains of Jōmon people of northern Japan (Tōhoku and Hokkaidō).

In addition, haplogroups D4, D5, M7b, M8, M9a, M10, G, A, B, and F have been found in Jōmon people as well. These latter haplogroups are all distributed widely among populations of East Asia (including modern Japanese, Ryukyuans, and Ainus) and Southeast Asia, but some of their subclades are distributed almost exclusively in Japan. From a mtDNA study of ancient Jomon and Yayoi found that mtDNA D5, G, M7a, M7b, M10, N9b are found exclusively in Jomon, Ainu, Ryukyuan, Japanese in various percentages but not in the ancient Yayoi people of Japan.

ATL retrovirus 
A gene common in Jōmon people is a retrovirus of ATL (human T lymphotropic virus, HTVL-I). This virus was discovered as a cause of adult T cell leukemia (ATL), and research was advanced by Takuo Hinuma of Kyoto University Virus Research Institute.

Although it was known that many virus carriers existed in Japan, it was not found at all in neighboring countries of East Asia. Meanwhile, it has been found in many Africans, Native Americans, Tibetans, Siberians, Burmese people, Indigenous people of New Guinea, Polynesians, etc. Looking at distribution in Japan, it is seen particularly frequently in southern Kyushu, Nagasaki Prefecture, Okinawa and among the Ainu. And it is seen at medium frequency in the southern part of Shikoku, southern part of the Kii Peninsula, the Pacific side of the Tōhoku region (Sanriku) and Oki Islands. Overall, carriers of the ATL retrovirus were found to be more common in remote areas and remote islands. When examining the well-developed areas of ATL in each region of Kyushu, Shikoku, and Tōhoku in detail, carriers are preserved at high rates in small settlements that were isolated from the surroundings and inconvenient for traffic.

The path of natural infection of this virus is limited to vertical infection between women and children (most often through breastfeeding) and horizontal infection between males and females (most often from males to females through sexual intercourse).

Based on the above, Hinuma concluded that the high frequency area of this virus indicates the high density remain of Jōmon people.

Ikawazu Jōmon studies 

A partial genome analysis by McColl et al. in 2018 about the prehistoric peopling of Southeast Asia analysed 26 ancient samples from Southeast Asia spanning from the late Neolithic to the Iron Age. They analysed an Ikawazu Jōmon (named IK002) sample from the Ikawazu Shell Midden site (伊川津貝塚) on the Atsumi Peninsula of southern Aichi Prefecture in central Honshu, and a draft sequence of the Jōmon genome was determined from IK002. This Jōmon individual was found to share some ancestry with prehistoric Hoabinhians, who also share some ancestry with Onge and Jehai (Peninsular Malaysia) in mainland Southeast Asia, which may represent gene flow from that group into the Jōmon period population. The Ikawazu Jōmon sample could be modeled as possible admixture of Southeast Asian Hoabinhian and East Asian Amis people. Her mitochondrial mtDNA is Haplogroup N9b which is typical of Northeast Siberian populations, this haplogroups in present-day Japaneses people (< 2.0%), but typically found in previous studies of Jomon mtDNA N9b 4% in Okinawans, 6.9% in modern Ulchi 8% in Modern Ainu, 32.3% in the Udegey, People of the Amur-Ussuri where the region carry high frequencies of N9b.

A more recent genetic analysis of the Ikawazu Jōmon sample (IK002), by Gakuhari et al. 2020, next to two additional Jōmon samples from northern Honshu and Hokkaido, found contradicting results. The Jōmon people descended predominantly from an Basal-East Asian population and does not share ancestry with Hoabhinians or Onge as suggested by McColl in 2018. The authors note that there is no genetic evidence for admixture or that the ancestral Jōmon lineage is closer to Hoabinhians, rejecting the conclusion by McColl. They concluded that there is also no evidence that Jōmon formed from admixture of Onge/Hoabhinians and Ami-related groups but that the Jōmon are mostly the direct descendants of the East Asian-related Upper Paleolithic population which arrived in Japan about 35,000 years ago from Mainland Southeast Asia or the Himalayan region. The Jōmon samples (including IK002), were found to be part of the "basal-East Asian cluster" (bEE), an ancient population that had no divergence among the ancestors of East Asians, Northeast Asians/East Siberian, and Native Americans. The Jōmon are genetically basal to modern East and Northeast Asians as well as Native Americans, suggesting that they share closer affinity towards the Ancient Northeast Asian/Eastern Siberian and Native American cluster (NA-ES-NA) rather than the Southern East Asian component. However, IK002 shows some affinity to the Amis people (one of the many Taiwanese indigenous peoples), which may support a later coastal migration into Japan outgoing from Taiwan.

Additionally the authors note the possible link between the microblade culture around Lake Baikal of Paleolithic Siberia and Jōmon period Hokkaido. The microblade culture is suggested to have arrived in Japan about ~25,000 years ago with an migration associated with the Ancient North Eurasians, an ancient population distantly related to modern Europeans and Middle Easterners, and which contributed about 30% ancestry into Native Americans and some other Paleo-Siberian ethnic groups. They further conclude that their results support the "dual structure model" for the origin of modern Japanese.

Funadomari Jōmon study 
A full genome analysis, using high-confidence SNPs and functional SNP assessments to assign possible phenotypic characteristics as well as Y-chromosome polymorphisms, analysed a male and a female Jomon sample (termed as "F23"). The Funadomari archaeological site is located on a sandbar separating Lake Kushu from Funadomari Bay on the north coast of Rebun Island, a small island off the northwestern tip of Hokkaidō. The study results suggest that the Hokkaido Jōmon are their own distinct population and not closely related to other populations. The Jōmon generally are closer to East-Eurasian populations and form a cluster near the “Basal East Asians”.

Modern Japanese share about 9% to 13% of their genome with the used Jōmon sample. Jōmon specific genome is also found in minor percentage in populations of Northeast Asia and Southeast Asia, suggesting gene-flow from Jōmon-related groups or more ancient shared source population. Additionally, the Hokkaido Jōmon share specific gene alleles with populations in the Arctic regions of Eurasia and northern America, absent from other East Asians. An analysis of phylogenetic relationship modeled the Funadomari Jōmon samples of Hokkaido with ~86% East Asian-related ancestry and ~14% deeply European-related ancestry.

Rebun Jōmon study 
Another full genome analysis of a 3,800 year old Jōmon woman shows that this sample shared gene variants which are found only in Arctic populations of Eurasia, but are absent elsewhere. According to the authors this provides evidence that the Jomon fished and hunted fatty sea and land animals. The sample also showed a higher alcohol tolerance than other East-Eurasian populations. Further analysis suggest that the Jōmon sample was at high risk of developing liver spots if she spent to much time in the sun. The Jōmon sample had wet earwax, which is rare among modern East Asian populations. Despite the strong differences, the Rebun Jōmon sample is relative closest to modern Japanese. Additionally the Rebun Jōmon sample is also relative closer to coastal groups such as Ulchi in Russia and some aboriginal Taiwanese.

A facial reconstruction in 2018 based on genome information of a 3,800 year old Jomon women from Rebun Island in Hokkaido showed that the color of the woman's skin was slightly darker than that of modern Japanese, her hair was thin and fine, and that the color of her eyes was light brown. Additionally, analysis revealed that the woman had blood type A+.

Full genome analyses of 2020 
A full genome analysis published in 2020, analysed for the first time the complete genome of several Jōmon samples. The study rejected previous arguments by McColl 2018 and Chuan-Chao Wang et al., who suggested a shared ancestry with Hoabhinians and Andamanese Onge.

In contrary, evidence for geneflow from an Basal East Asian-related group into the Hoabhinians and the Andamanese Onge was detected. The Jōmon themselves share relatively most genome with East Asians and less with Paleolithic Siberians, as well as with modern people in Japan and various groups around the Sea of Okhotsk.

In another analysis in 2020 of modern and ancient East-Eurasian samples from Southeast Asia, East Asia and Siberia researchers found that the Jōmon people (named "Jōmon_HG" for Jomon period hunter gatherers) could be modeled from two distinct components: one "East Asian-related" component and one "currently unsamplified" component (or multiple components), probably from Paleolithic Siberia. They also could not reproduce the special affinity between Jōmon and Hoabhinians and Andamanese as suggested in a 2018 study by McColl, but found contrary evidence that an ancient population related to the Tibetan lineage (including the Chokhopani sample), contributed to both the Jōmon hunter gatherers and less to ancient Southeast Asian hunter gatherers.

Higashimyo Jōmon study 
A study in 2021 by Adachi et al. analyzed a Jōmon sample (~5,000 BC) from the Higashimyo cave near Saga on the island of Kyushu, which adds further evidence to the regional differences among the Jōmon period populations. The Higashimyo Jōmon sample was found to be genetically relative closest to other Jōmon samples and to various East Asian groups, such as Taiwanese indigenous peoples (Ami and Atayal), Kankanaey and Ilocano of northern Philippines, as well as Koreans and Japanese people. However, since only 6.9% of the nuclear genome was readable in the Higashimyo individual, no reliable conclusion could be made. According to the authors, the main ancestry component of the Jōmon period population of Japan shares ancestry with contemporary East Asians but split about 22,000 years ago, close to the split between East Asians and ancestral Native Americans. However, non-East Asian geneflow into the Jōmon period population resulted in their unique position and internal diversity, which got strengthened by later isolation, migration, and genetic drift. Unlike Hokkaido Jomon samples, the Higashimyo individual belonged to mitochondrial DNA haplogroup M7a1, rather than N9b. Like previous studies, a distinction between Northern and Southern Jōmon was detected, with the Southern Jōmon (represented by the Higashimyo sample) likely being the source of Jōmon ancestry among modern Japanese, rather than Northern Jōmon. The authors note that more studies are needed to better understand the internal diversity of the Jōmon people and their historical formation.

Reevaluation of the genetic position of the Jōmon lineage in 2021 

A study in 2021 by Cooke et al., reevaluated the phylogenetic relationship of various Jōmon samples with other populations, and estimated that the Jōmon lineage split from modern East Asians between 15,000BC and 20,000BC, but after the divergence of Ancestral Native Americans in ~25,000BC. The authors than analyzed whether the Jōmon population had any contact with other continental Upper Paleolithic people after the divergence of their lineage, but before they became isolated in the Japanese archipelago. The inferred Jōmon ancestry among modern Japanese people is estimated at a mean average of 9.31%.

Descendants
Recent studies note that the Jōmon people consisted of several ethnic groups that arrived in Japan at different times and later converged into the pre-Yayoi population of Japan. However, the studies used to theorise the modern-day descendents of the originally-mixed ethnic group used modelled ancestry by comparing various Jōmon period samples with modern populations, and they may not be indicative of actual shared ancestry.

Ainu people 

It is generally agreed that the Ainu people are the descendants of the Hokkaido Jōmon.

A recent genetic study (Gakuhari et al. 2020) suggests about 79.3% of the ancestry of the Ainu comes from the Hokkaido Jōmon. A study by Kanazawa-Kiriyama et al. (2019) suggests about 66% Hokkaido Jōmon ancestry in the Ainu people.

Emishi 
The Emishi, a former non-Yamato group in central Honshu, are often linked to the Ainu people, but several historians suggest that they either their own Jōmon group and did not share close cultural connections to the Ainu, or they consisted of several different tribes.

The Satsumon culture of northern Honshu, one of the cultures that merged to later form Ainu culture, is often speculated to be related to the Emishi culture.

Other historians suggest that the Emishi were in fact largely Japanese people who spoke the Izumo dialect of the Japonic languages, and resisted the imperial rule of the Yamato Dynasty.

Yamato (Japanese) people 
The Yamato Japanese are mostly descended from the Yayoi/Kofun period people but also have admixture from the Jōmon period population. It is estimated that the Jōmon ancestry found in the Yamato Japanese is less than 20%. Another study estimates the Jōmon ancestry in people from Tokyo at approximately 12%. One study estimates about 10% of Jōmon ancestry in modern Yamato people.

Another study on autosomal DNA by Kanazawa-Kiriyama et al. (2019) finds about 9-13% Jōmon ancestry in the modern Japanese (with the remainder being from the Yayoi).

Ryukyuan people 
According to several studies, the Ryukyuan people share more alleles with the Jōmon period (16,000–3,000 years ago) hunter-gatherers and Ainu people than do the Yamato Japanese and have smaller genetic contributions from Asian continental populations.

Within the Japanese population, the Ryukyuans form a separate genome-wide cluster as one of two along the main island of Honshu. The local Jōmon ancestry is estimated at approximately 28% or 50-60%, depending on various studies. The admixture event which formed the admixed Ryukyuans was estimated to be at least 1100–1075 years ago, which corresponds to the Gusuku period, and is considered to be related to the arrival of migrants from Japan. Thus, the Ryukyuans appear to be genetically closest to the Ainu from the Ainu viewpoint, whereas it is exactly the opposite from the Ryukyuans' viewpoint, who are closest to the Yamato Japanese.

According to recent genome studies, Ryukyuans and especially Okinawans are the closest to other East Asians but are also relatively homogenous on a genetic level. The study did not find much evidence for a strong Jōmon influence on Ryukyuans. On average, the Okinawans were found to share 80.8% admixture with the Japanese and 19.2% admixture with the Chinese. Individual admixture estimates were quite variable and ranged from 5.84% to 57.82% Chinese admixture, which likely coincides with historical migrations of Chinese people to Okinawa.

A study by Kanazawa-Kiriyama et al. (2019) suggests that Ryukyuans inherit about 27% of their ancestry from the local Jōmon, with rest being from the Yayoi people.

In popular culture 
Aspects of the Jōmon culture and pottery were used in the video game The Legend of Zelda: Breath of the Wild. Nintendo's art director Takizawa Satoru said that the Jōmon culture was the inspiration for the "Sheikah slates, shrines and other ancient objects" in the game.

A recreated Jōmon village in the form of an experience park (Sarashina no Sato), which offers different activities, can be visited in Chikuma, Nagano.

See also 
 History of Japan
 Yayoi people
 Okhotsk culture
 Satsumon culture
 Emishi
 Indigenous peoples of the Americas

References

Ancient Japan
Archaeology of Japan
Jōmon period
Tribes of ancient Japan